Deltophora pauperella is a moth of the family Gelechiidae. It is found in India (Punjab).

The length of the forewings is about 6.5 mm. The forewings are light ochreous, with dark brown markings.

References

Moths described in 1979
Deltophora
Taxa named by Klaus Sattler